Eucalyptus falcata, commonly known as silver mallet or toolyumuck, is a species of mallee or marlock that is endemic to Western Australia. It has smooth bark, lance-shaped to curved adult leaves, flower buds in groups of eleven or thirteen, creamy white or yellowish green flowers and flattened spherical fruit.

Description
It has smooth, silvery gray and green-gray over pale brown-orange bark. Flowering occurs between August and May and the flowers are creamy white or yellowish green.

This species is closely related to E. ornata and E. recta, as well as the recently described E. rugulata and E. purpurata.

Taxonomy and naming
Eucalyptus falcata was first formally described in 1847 by Nikolai Turczaninow in Bulletin de la Société Impériale des Naturalistes de Moscou from a specimen collected by James Drummond. The specific epithet (falcata) is a Latin word meaning "sickle-shaped".

Noongar peoples know the tree as toolyumuck.

Distribution and habitat
Silver mallet has a scattered distribution of isolated populations from near Kojonup, to near Corrigin and north to Tammin, in the Avon Wheatbelt, Esperance Plains, Geraldton Sandplains, Jarrah Forest, Mallee, Swan Coastal Plain and Warren biogeographic regions. It is often found on the top or slopes of lateritic rises and is associated with species such as E. astringens, E. densa, E. incrassata, E. salmonophloia, E. urna and E. wandoo.

Conservation status
This eucalypt is classified as "not threatened" by the Western Australian Government Department of Parks and Wildlife.

See also
List of Eucalyptus species

References

Eucalypts of Western Australia
falcata
Myrtales of Australia
Plants described in 1847
Taxa named by Nikolai Turczaninow
Endemic flora of Southwest Australia